Hayles is a surname, and may refer to:

 Andrew Hayles, American basketball player
 Barry Hayles, English born Jamaican football player
 Brian Hayles, English television and film writer
 John Hayles, Tudor agrarian reformer (more commonly Hales)
 Ian Hayles (born 1972), Jamaican politician
 N. Katherine Hayles, American literary critic and theorist
 Rob Hayles, English cyclist
 Eustace Robert Hayles. Australian entrepreneur
 Percy Hayles, Jamaican boxer of the 1950s, 1960s and 1970s

See also
 Hales (surname)
 Heyl (surname)

Surnames
English-language surnames
Surnames of English origin
Surnames of British Isles origin